MVP 2: Most Vertical Primate is a 2001 film, and the second in the MVP series.  The film's title character, Jack,  is a fictional chimpanzee. It is a sequel to MVP: Most Valuable Primate.

Plot
MVP 2 opens with the lovable Jack being invited to play for the Seattle Simians hockey team, but when the Los Angeles Carjackers team sets Jack up by making it look like he bit the finger of one of the players, Jack leaves while other Simians players look for him. Jack meets Ben, a runaway homeless skater boy, who lives in a shack at an old pool. Over time, the two become best friends, but when a police officer finds out where Jack and Ben live, they have to leave the pool. When leaving the pool, Ben breaks his board but was going to enter a skating competition and get sponsored. Jack goes to Oliver Plant's dumpster full of old skateboard stuff but Oliver finds Ben who tells him about his board and the competition so Oliver gives him a board to use. They stay with Oliver overnight with him not knowing about the pool incident, but when Oliver says "good night, Ben", Ben suspects him of knowing that he was a runaway. Jack asks him to stay since there is no other place to sleep, Ben agrees. Earlier in the story, Oliver gets a visit from someone who deals with children like Ben so that night Oliver calls her and says he found Ben. The next day they go to the competition and when it's Ben's turn, he says he can't do it, but Jack realizes he has the uncanny ability to skateboard. He says he would ride with Ben, so Ben decides to do it. Ben wins the competition and gets sponsored by Bob Burnquist and Oliver adopts Ben. Meanwhile, Louie, Jack's little brother, gets a ride to Seattle and pretends to be Jack, being terrible at hockey. But Jack shows up and wins ZHL cup for the Simians. After the Simians win and Jack and Louie decide to go back home, Ben gives Louie a skate board so Jack can teach him. In the last part of the movie, Louie rides down a ramp back at their home.

Cast
 Russell Ferrier – Darren
 Richard Karn – Ollie Plant
 Cameron Bancroft – Rob Poirier
 Scott Goodman – Ben Johnson
 Troy Ruptash – Tyson Fowler
 Ian Bagg – Olaf Schickendanz
 Dolores Drake – Barbara
 Fred Keating – Coach Miller
 Craig March – Coach Skinner
 Brenna – Brenna Sometime's
 Gus Lynch – Bud Fulton
 Bernie and Louie – Jack
 Bob Burnquist - Himself
 Robert Jones – Dr. Franky

Release
The film was released in Canada on October 5, 2001. It was given a limited release in the United States on January 11, 2002 for one weekend before its VHS and DVD a week later by Warner Home Video on January 22. As with its predecessor, Buena Vista Home Entertainment acquired certain distribution rights in some regions.

Reception
On Rotten Tomatoes the film has three reviews listed, all negative.

References

External links
 
 

2001 films
Skateboarding films
2000s sports comedy films
American children's films
Films about animals playing sports
Films about apes
Films directed by Robert Vince
2000s English-language films
2000s children's films
2001 comedy films
2000s American films